This is a list of episodes of the Japanese anime series Ghost Hound. It began airing October 18, 2007 and spanned twenty-two episodes. Several episode titles contain references to various physiological, biological, neurological, philosophical and science fiction terms.

Episode list

References

Ghost Hound